Caroline Paterson (born 1965) is a Scottish actress and director who has appeared in many Scottish television shows such as one-off STV drama, The Steamie and the BBC's Rab C. Nesbitt. However, she is most recognised for her role in EastEnders as Ruth Fowler. She also appeared as Patricia Cullen in BBC Scotland soap River City.In 2005 she had a one episode appearance in the BAFTA award-winning BBC series Spooks as Jessica Mortimer. In 2008, Paterson appeared in Coronation Street as police detective D.C. Weller after David Platt pushed his mother, Gail down the stairs of their home, and again in December 2008 to investigate allegations against Tony Gordon. She had a cameo role in the sixth season of Skins as the mother of Franky. She also appeared in River City, as Sandra Devlin.

References

External links
 

1965 births
Living people
Scottish soap opera actresses
Scottish television actresses